Demon Wind is a 1990 American horror film directed by Charles Philip Moore. The film concerns a group of friends who travel to an old farm, and soon find they cannot leave as a mysterious fog sets in.

Synopsis
In 1931, a body is burned on a cross. On a farm, a woman named Regina attempts to barricade a door, from where beyond, demons try to enter. Her husband George transforms into a demon instead and kills her.

Sixty years later, after the suicide of his father, a young man named Cory, the grandson of Regina and George, and his girlfriend Elaine, along with a group of their friends, travel up to the farm, so that Cory can figure out what happened to his grandparents. They are attacked by a band of vicious demons. When the kids try to escape, a mysterious fog brings them back to the farm, protected by a shield that prevents the demons from entering the house.  One by one, the kids become possessed by the demons, but manage to fight them off with a pair of daggers they find, which is the only thing that will kill them. Eventually only Cory and his girlfriend Elaine remain alive. The two discover that Cory is able to defeat the evil by transforming into a higher being. The battle nearly ends them both, but they are able to win. As they flee and return to civilization a possessed townsperson watches them from the hills, implying that they did not completely defeat the evil.

Cast
 Eric Larson as Cory
 Francine Lapensée as Elaine
 Rufus Norris as Harcourt
 Jack Forcinito as Stacey (credited as Jack Vogel)
 Stephen Quadros as Chuck
 Mark David Fritsche as Jack
 Sherry Leigh as Bonnie (credited as Sherry Bendorf)
 Bobby Johnston as Dell
 Lynn Clark as Terri
 Richard Gabai - Willy
 Mia Ruiz as Reena
 Kym Santelle as Harriet
 Stella Kastner as Grandmother Regina
 Axel Toowey as George
 C.D.J. Koko as Grand Demon (credited as D. Koko)

Production

Demon Wind was filmed in 1989 in Thousand Oaks, California.

Release
Demon Wind premiered in Germany on July 20, 1990, followed by a VHS release in the United States by Prism Entertainment in conjunction with Paramount Home Video on September 13, 1990. The release featured a 3D lenticular video cover.

In October 2017, Vinegar Syndrome released a 2K restoration of the film on DVD and Blu-ray.

Demon Wind can be watched in its entirety in the video game High on Life, featuring a full-length commentary by Red Letter Media.

Reception

A writer for the Fort Worth Star-Telegram gave the film a score of one star. Matt Donato reviewed the film for SlashFilm, calling it "an impossibly rewarding, continuous grab bag of genre absurdity that is as flummoxing as it is utterly transcendent". Joe Bob Briggs screened the movie as part of The Last Drive-In on Shudder, calling it "the only haunted house, time-travel, vomit-spewing demon zombie apocalypse, multi-generational satan worship martial arts film."

Notes

References

External links
 

1990s monster movies
1990 horror films
American monster movies
1990 films
Films directed by Charles Philip Moore
Films set on farms
1990s English-language films
1990s American films